The Bluetones is the fifth album by the eponymous band, released on 9 October 2006.

The album sees the band reunite with producer Hugh Jones, who was at the controls for the band's first two albums, Expecting to Fly and Return to the Last Chance Saloon. Despite largely positive reviews, the album failed to chart in the Top 75 UK Albums Chart after its first week on release. The lead single was "My Neighbour's House", which reached #68 in the UK chart. A second single, "Head on a Spike", was released on 4 December 2006, on CD and download. The third single "Surrendered", was released on 26 February 2007, on CD and download.

Track listing
All tracks written by: Chesters, Devlin, Morriss, Morriss:
  "Surrendered"
  "Baby, Back Up"
  "Hope and Jump"
  "Head on a Spike"
  "The King of Outer Space"
  "Thank You, Not Today"
  "My Neighbour's House"
  "Fade In/Fade Out"
  "The Last Song But One"
  "Wasn't I Right About You?"

Trivia

The song "Fade In/Fade Out" was written in honour of British comedian (and star of Little Britain) David Walliams, a personal friend of Mark Morriss, who swam the English Channel for Sport Relief in 2006.

References 

The Bluetones albums
2006 albums
Albums produced by Hugh Jones (producer)
Cooking Vinyl albums